The following is a list of Saturn Award winners for Best Guest Starring Role on Television (or Best Guest Performance in a Television Series).

The award is presented annually by the Academy of Science Fiction, Fantasy and Horror Films, honoring the work of actors and actresses in science fiction, fantasy, and horror fiction on television. The category was split into two awards: Saturn Award for Best Guest-Starring Performance in a Streaming Television Series and Saturn Award for Best Guest Starring Performance in a Network or Cable Television Series at the 47th Saturn Awards.

(NOTE: Year refers to year of eligibility, the actual ceremonies are held the following year)

The winners are listed in bold.

Winners and Nominees

2000s

2010s

2020s

Multiple nominations
4 nominations
 Jeffrey Dean Morgan

2 nominations
 Jon Cryer
 Robert Forster
 Giancarlo Esposito

External links
 Official Site
 35th, 36th, 37th, 38th, 39th, 40th, 41st, 42nd, 43rd

Guest Starring Role on Television